Diana Kaarina (born March 17, 1975) is a Canadian voice and stage actress based in Vancouver, British Columbia.

Career
Kaarina was born in Vancouver, British Columbia and raised in Richmond, British Columbia. She got her start with Theatre Under the Stars in Stanley Park and has performed in Canadian and Broadway productions of numerous musicals, including Anne of Green Gables – The Musical, The Phantom of the Opera, Les Misérables, and Rent.

In 2010, Kaarina was cast as the role of Barbie in Barbie: A Fashion Fairytale, replacing usual actress Kelly Sheridan for several films in the Barbie series before Sheridan resumed the role in 2012.

In 2012, she provided the voice of Kelly Hamdon in SheZow.

In 2014, she provided the voice of Aria Blaze in My Little Pony: Equestria Girls – Rainbow Rocks.

In 2015, she provided the voice of Matilda Marshall in The Deep.

In 2018, Kaarina voices both Roxie McTerrier and Petula Woolwright in Littlest Pet Shop: A World of Our Own. She provided the voice of Vanessa in The Hollow.

Kaarina has also done voiceovers for various radio commercials and PSAs.

Filmography

Animation
 Adventures of Ayuma (short) - Lamia
 Barbie: A Camping We Will Go (short) - Barbie
 Barbie: A Fashion Fairytale - Barbie
 Barbie: A Fairy Secret - Barbie
 Barbie: A Perfect Christmas - Barbie
 Barbie: Princess Charm School - Blair Willows
 Beat Bugs - Lady Madonna, Olga
 Bob's Broken Sleigh - Accountant Elf
 Bob the Builder: Adventures by the Sea - Scartch singing voice
 Bob the Builder: Ready, Steady, Build! - Scartch singing voice (episode: "Here Comes Muck")
 Care Bears: Adventures in Care-A-Lot - Laugh-A-Lot Bear (episode: ″Battle of the Bands")
 Corner Gas Animated - Kendra 
 The Deep - Matilda Marshall, Dr. Jennifer Chan
 Dinosaur Train - Tricia Troodon
 Enchantimals - Danessa Deer
 Fluffy Bunch - Gigi Serbio
 The Hollow - Vanessa, Pixie #2
 Littlest Pet Shop- Gracie Plansville, Mitzi, Lucky Browne, Deer, Panda #2, Sweetly Ganache, Yellow Bunny, Hopley Grazer, Ritzy Rococo, Mellowy Lilacs, Cherie Bow-Wow, Milah, Daphne Deerheart, Essie Beagleton, Roxy Reddington, Stripes Reddy, Albany Perth, Chi-Chi Ostos, Grayden Snows, Bria Bunner
 Littlest Pet Shop: A World of Our Own - Roxie McTerrier, Petula Woolwright, Happy Puppy, Edie Von Keet (singing voice), Dog #8, Snake, Human, Bella Flamenco, Husky, Julia Chillavanilla, Bumble Bee, Dooley Wolfhound, Skyla Wolfton, Furrocious Fran
 Littlest Pet Shop: Lucky Pets - Molasses, Puddles, Marlowe, Davi, Palmer, Nori, Dade, Tarot (in season 2,3,4), Fridah, Sky Banner, Cali Sue, Others
 Littlest Pet Shop: Keep Me Pack - Cookie Jar, Monkey, Others
 LoliRock - Lily Bowman
 Marvel Super Hero Adventures - Nebula
 Maya the Bee - Lara the Ladybug and Beatrice the Butterfly
 Mighty Mighty Monsters in New Fears Eve - Destiny 
 My Little Pony: Equestria Girls – Rainbow Rocks - Aria Blaze
 My Little Pony: Equestria Girls – Sunset's Backstage Pass - Aria Blaze
 My Little Pony: Friendship Is Magic - Saffron Masala, Burly Unicorn, Canterlot Pony #2 (episode: "Spice Up Your Life"), Shimmy Shake, Aura, Noi, Neat-Maned Townspony, Helia, Heidi Hay, Coral Shores, Earth Filly #3, Unicorn Filly #2
 My Little Pony: Pony Life - Skull Pony, Uranus, Girl Pony #3, Banana Fluff, Cupcake
 My Little Pony: A New Generation - Yellow Unicorn, Earth Pony
 Polly Pocket - Mrs. Bigowski (episode: "The Big Ball")
 SheZow - Kelly Hamdon
 Shopkins: Wild - Hip Hip Hamster, Candy Sweets, Valentine Heart, Others
 StarBeam - Mom, WonderBeam, Tricksy, Aquarium Worker
 Strawberry Shortcake's Berry Bitty Adventures - Sour Grapes, Baby Berrykin #2, Elsa, Berrykin Race Official
 Strawberry Shortcake: Berry In The Big City - Blueberry Muffin, Everything Muffin, Everything Bagel, Cheesecake, Woman #2, Mrs. Crumbcake, Girl
 Super Dinosaur - Agent Wan
 Super Monsters - Spike, Mrs. Gong, Mrs. Sandford, Chompy, Abigail's Mom
 Supernatural Academy - Santra, Zadi & Nimbu
 We're Lalaloopsy - Rosy Bumps 'n Bruises, Bluebell Dewdrop, Mittens Fluff 'N' Stuff, Confetti Carnivale, Fancy Frost 'N' Glaze, May Little Spring, Stuff Others

Video games
 Little Battlers Experience - Rika Yazawa

Theatre
 Anne of Green Gables – The Musical - Diana Barry, Anne Shirley (understudy)
 Les Misérables - Eponine
 The Marvelous Wonderettes - Suzy
 The Phantom of the Opera - Meg Giry
 Rent - Mimi Márquez, Maureen Johnson (swing)
 Thoroughly Modern Millie - Millie Dillmount, Miss Dorothy Brown

References

External links
 Official website
 
 
 

Living people
Actresses from Vancouver
Canadian stage actresses
Canadian voice actresses
1975 births